Kaistia granuli is a Gram-negative, chemoorganotrophic, non-spore-forming, rod-shaped and non-motile bacterium from the genus of Kaistia which has been isolated from sludge from a wastewater treatment plant in Gongju in Korea.

References

External links
Type strain of Kaistia granuli at BacDive -  the Bacterial Diversity Metadatabase	

Hyphomicrobiales
Bacteria described in 2007